Anovelo da Imbonate was an Italian painter and manuscript illuminator of the 14th and 15th century, active in a Gothic style in Milan.
 
Little is known about his biography. He was likely born near Como, Italy. He signed the illuminated Messale dell'Incoronazione (Coronation Missal, circa 1395) found in the Basilica of San Ambrogio belonging to Gian Galeazzo Visconti. A second work is the Messale di Santa Tecla (1402). Among other influential illuminators of his age, whose works may have been seen by Anovelo are those of Giovannino de' Grassi and Giovanni di Benedetto da Como.

Frescoes in the Oratorio di Santo Stefano, Lentate sul Seveso are attributed to Anovelo.

Gallery

References

14th-century births
15th-century deaths
14th-century Italian painters
Italian male painters
15th-century Italian painters
Manuscript illuminators
Painters from Milan